"The Suburbs"/"Month of May" is a single from Arcade Fire's third album The Suburbs. It was released on June 1, 2010. It reached number 94 on the Canadian Hot 100.

Music video
A music video was made for the single and was uploaded to YouTube on November 22, 2010. The video is a shortened version of the short film Scenes from the Suburbs, directed by Spike Jonze and inspired by the album itself.

In February 2011, music video blog Yes, We've Got a Video! ranked the song's music video at number 7 in their top 30 videos of 2010. The video was praised as "a twisted, haunting view of the insecurities, frustrations and fear that can come with seemingly innocent suburban life."

Track listing

Charts

References

External links
 Official website

2010 singles
Arcade Fire songs
Music videos directed by Spike Jonze